The Indiana Asteroid Program was a photographic astronomical survey of asteroids during 1949–1967, at the U.S. Goethe Link Observatory near Brooklyn, Indiana. The program was initiated by Frank K. Edmondson of Indiana University using a 10-inch f/6.5 Cooke triplet astrographic camera.

Its objectives included recovering asteroids that were far from their predicted positions, making new orbital calculations or revising old ones, deriving magnitudes accurate to about 0.1 mag, and training students.

When the observatory's 36-inch (0.91-meter) reflecting telescope proved unsuitable for searching for asteroids, postdoctoral fellow James Cuffey arranged the permanent loan of a 10-inch (25-centimeter) lens from the University of Cincinnati. Mounted in a shed near the main observatory, the instrument using the borrowed lens was responsible for all of the program's discoveries.

By 1958, the program had produced 3,500 photographic plates showing 12,000 asteroid images and had published about 2,000 accurate positions in the Minor Planet Circular. When the program ended in 1967, it had discovered a total of 119 asteroids. The program's highest numbered discovery, 30718 Records, made in 1955, was not named until November 2007.

The program ended when the lights of the nearby city of Indianapolis became too bright to permit the long exposures required for the photographic plates. The program's nearly 7,000 photographic plates are now archived at Lowell Observatory.

List of discovered minor planets 

The Indiana Asteroid Program has discovered 119 asteroids during 1949–1966. The Minor Planet Center officially credits these discoveries to "Indiana University" rather than to the program itself.

References 
 

Astrometry
Astronomical discoveries by institution

Indiana University